Harold Keiser Levering (December 20, 1894 – September 15, 1967) was an American politician and a Republican member of the California State Assembly, representing District 60 from 1949 to 1963. He served as majority leader of the assembly in 1953. The Levering Act of 1950 is named after him.

References

1894 births
1967 deaths
Republican Party members of the California State Assembly
20th-century American politicians
United States Army personnel of World War II